A statue of Vincent and Theo van Gogh by Ossip Zadkine stands on Vincent van Goghplein (Dutch:Vincent van Gogh square) in the town of Zundert in the Netherlands. The bronze statue was unveiled by Queen Juliana on 28 May 1964.

Description
It depicts two men standing on a thick square bronze base plate, mounted on a low square stone plinth. The attenuated figures have similar modelling to Zadkine's statue De verwoeste stad ("The devastated city") in Rotterdam. The figures stand close together, intertwined, holding hands and leaning their heads together, although neither figure closely resembles the person it is intended to represent.  

It contains a tube with soil from the garden of the hospital at the monastery of Saint-Paul-de-Mausole, where Vincent was treated for his mental health condition.  

The plinth has weathered from white to a dirty yellow, stained by verdigris leached from the bronze sculpture.  The front is inscribed with a quotation in French from one of the last letters written by Vincent to Theo van Gogh, dated 23 July 1890.  This letter remained unfinished and unsent at the time of Vincent's death; he had it with him when he shot himself on 27 July, causing wounds that ultimately led to his death two days later:
par mon intermédiaire tu as ta part à 
la production même de certaines toiles qui 
même dans la debâcle gardent leur calme 
   uit de laatste brief van vincent aan theo 

The words can be liberally translated to English as
through my deeds you have witnessed 
the creation of several paintings which 
will breathe tranquillity even in times of upheaval
   from the last letter from vincent to theo

Reception

The statue was a gift from Van Lanschot Bankiers, to mark the 225th anniversary of the founding of the bank in 1737. The Van Lanschot family were also originally from Zundert. The Van Gogh brothers were born nearby, Vincent in 1853 and Theo in 1857.

Zadkine was commissioned to make the sculpture in 1963.  He made at least four sculptures and busts of Vincent van Gogh between 1955 and 1964, including a statue of Vincent standing alone unveiled in 1961 in Auvers-sur-Oise, near Paris, where Vincent died in 1890 and where both brothers are buried in adjacent plots, and a bust of Vincent for the asylum at Saint-Rémy-de-Provence.  

In his earlier work, Zadkine had discussed the relationship of Vincent with his brother with Van Gogh expert Mark Tralbaut, and an initial design had the two men seated, but Zadkine quickly abandoned that concept; within a matter of days after the commission was granted, he worked up a plaster model of the men standing together.  He presented the model to journalists in Zundert on 14 May 1963.  

The bronze sculpture was cast at the Susse Frères foundry in Paris. It bears the inscriptions "O Zadkine 1963" and "Susse Fondeur Paris". It was unveiled by Queen Juliana on 28 May 1964, in the presence of Zadkine, Mark Tralbaut, and the Mayor of Zundert, GJA Manders.

References

 Vincent & Theo van Gogh, Mens & Dier in Steen & Brons, vanderkrogt.net
 Ossip ZADKINE - sculpture de Van Gogh, van-gogh.fr
 Van Gogh and Zadkine in Auvers-sur-Oise: Is There Anything to See?, francerevisited.com, 14 June 2011
 Beeld Van Vincent En Theo Van Gogh, Rijksdienst voor het Cultureel Erfgoed
 Beeld Van Vincent En Theo Van Gogh, Rijksdienst voor het Cultureel Erfgoed
 Neerlandia/Nederlands van Nu. Jaargang 112(2008)
 Penning, Theo en Vincent van Gogh, door Zadkine, 1964, Haffmans Antiek 
 Van Gogh Monument Zadkine, Van Gogh Brabant

Bronze sculptures in the Netherlands
1963 sculptures
Zundert
Sculptures by Ossip Zadkine
Works about Vincent van Gogh
Van Lanschot Kempen